Gábor Vladár (14 October 1881 – 19 July 1972) was a Hungarian politician and jurist, who served as Minister of Justice in 1944. After the ministerial council meeting on 14 October 1944 he decreed the permission of the left-wing press and the forbidding of the far-right media and finally the political prisoners' release.

References
 Magyar Életrajzi Lexikon

1881 births
1972 deaths
People from Biatorbágy
Justice ministers of Hungary